Everwijn Johan Maarten van der Linden (born 9 March 1969 in Voorburg, South Holland) is a former rower from the Netherlands, who competed for his native country in two consecutive Summer Olympics, starting in 1996. He won the silver medal in the men's lightweight double sculls event in Atlanta, United States, alongside Pepijn Aardewijn. The pair came in 12th in 2000 in Sydney, Australia.

References
Sports-Reference profile

1969 births
Living people
Dutch male rowers
Olympic medalists in rowing
Olympic rowers of the Netherlands
Olympic silver medalists for the Netherlands
Rowers at the 1996 Summer Olympics
Rowers at the 2000 Summer Olympics
Sportspeople from Voorburg
Medalists at the 1996 Summer Olympics
20th-century Dutch people
21st-century Dutch people